The Covered Trailer is a 1939 American comedy film directed by Gus Meins and written by Jack Townley. The film stars James Gleason, Lucile Gleason, Russell Gleason, Harry Davenport, Mary Beth Hughes and Tommy Ryan. The film was released on November 10, 1939, by Republic Pictures.

In this entry in the comedy series the "Higgins Family," the group must cancel a cruise to South America after the check they needed does not arrive. To save face before their neighbors, the family embarks upon a wilderness fishing trip. The family made a wise decision to forgo the cruise as the boat sinks and everyone is lost. This creates havoc for the Higgins family neighbors who believe they went down with the ship.

Cast
James Gleason as Joe Higgins
Lucile Gleason as Lil Higgins
Russell Gleason as Sidney Higgins
Harry Davenport as Grandpa Ed Carson
Mary Beth Hughes as Betty Higgins
Tommy Ryan as Tommy Higgins
Maurice Murphy as Bill Williams
Maude Eburne as Widow Ella Jones
Spencer Charters as Sheriff
Tom Kennedy as Otto
Hobart Cavanaugh as E. L. Beamish
Pierre Watkin as Horace Cartwright
Frank Dae as Police Chief
Richard Tucker as Doctor
Willie Best as Baltimore
Walter Fenner as Wells

References

External links

1939 films
1930s English-language films
American comedy films
1939 comedy films
Republic Pictures films
Films directed by Gus Meins
American black-and-white films
Films with screenplays by Jack Townley
1930s American films